TXN may refer to:

 TXN (gene), a gene encoding Thioredoxin
 Tarangan language (ISO 639:txn), spoken by inhabitants of the Aru Islands in eastern Indonesia
 Texas Instruments (NASDAQ: TXN)
 Texas Network, a media company
 Texas & New Mexico Railway (reporting mark: TXN)
 The Experts Network, an interactive digital sports network
 TX Network, Japan
 Huangshan Tunxi International Airport (IATA: TXN), China
 TXN, abbreviation for transaction (disambiguation)
 TXN, abbreviation for transcription (genetics)